{{Infobox artist
| name           = Pieter Cornelisz van Slingelandt
| image          = Slingelandt, Pieter Cornelis van - himself - 17th century.jpg
| caption        = <small>Self-portrait in oval frame''.</small>
| birth_name      = Pieter Cornelisz
| birth_date      = 1640
| birth_place     = Leiden
| death_date      = 
| death_place     = Leiden
| nationality    = Dutch
| field          = Painting
| movement       = Fijnschilder
}}Pieter Cornelisz van Slingelandt''' (20 October 1640 – 7 November 1691) was a Dutch Golden Age portrait painter who had been a pupil of Gerard Dou and is known as one of Leiden's fijnschilders.

Biography
According to Houbraken, his teacher was Gerard Dou, whom he imitated so well that many of his works were later misattributed to him. He was rather introverted and very methodical and conscientious, spending months on his works and striving for perfection. Houbraken especially liked a piece where a maid holds a mouse by the tail as a cat jumps for it.

Houbraken wrote that Slingelandt took 3 years to paint a family portrait for the gentleman Mr. Meerman, and that he took 6 weeks to paint the lace of one child's bib. That painting currently hangs in the Louvre.

According to the RKD he became a member of the Leiden Guild of St. Luke on November 22, 1661. He remained a member until 1668, and after a break of five years began paying dues again from 1673-1680. In 1690 he became headman, and in 1691 deacon of the guild. Though he appears in the catalogue raisonné of C. Hofstede de Groot, the only painting mentioned there is one that is no longer attributed to Slingelandt. His pupils were Jacob van der Sluys, and Jan Tilius. Adriaen van Gaesbeeck, who was also sometimes mentioned as a pupil of Slingelandt, was in reality 19 years older and died when Slingelandt was only 9 years old.

References

 Leidse fijnschilders: van Gerrit Dou tot Frans van Mieris de Jonge 1630-1760, Leiden, Stedelijk Museum de Lakenhal, 1988, p. 205-213

External links

Works and literature on Pieter Cornelisz van Slingelandt
Pieter Cornelisz van Slingelandt on Artnet

1640 births
1691 deaths
Dutch Golden Age painters
Dutch male painters
Artists from Leiden
Painters from Leiden